Erich Naumann (29 April 1905 – 7 June 1951) was an SS-Brigadeführer, member of the SD, and a convicted war criminal. Naumann had a key role in the Holocaust in Eastern Europe as the commander of Einsatzgruppe VI and the commander of Einsatzgruppe B.

Early life and career

Born 29 April 1905, in Meissen, Saxony, Erich Naumann left school at the age of sixteen and was employed in a commercial firm in his home town of Meissen. He joined the Nazi Party in November 1929 (nr. 170257). In 1933, Naumann joined the SA in a full-time capacity and then became an official and officer of police. He joined the SD in 1935. Naumann was the commander of Einsatzgruppe VI during its short-lived existence. During the invasion of Poland, the unit murdered over 6000 people as part of Operation Tannenberg. Afterwards, Naumann was Chief of Einsatzgruppe B from November 1941 until February or March 1943. 

During November 1941, reports he sent to Adolf Eichmann state that he was responsible for the deaths of 17,256 people in Smolensk. Under his command, he admitted that his Einsatzgruppe possessed three gas vans which "were used to exterminate human beings". In another report, dated 15 December 1942, Naumann reported that the Einsatzgruppe B had shot a total of 134,298 people.

From September 1943 to July 1944, Naumann was the commander of the Security Police and SD in the Netherlands. In this position, he assisted the perpetrators of Operation Silbertanne approved of executions carried out by Henk Feldmeijer and Feldmeijer's death squad.

War crimes trial and execution

After capture by the Allies, Naumann stood trial in front of a U.S. military court during the Einsatzgruppen trial. During the proceedings he repeatedly stated that he did not consider his actions during his tenure as commanding officer of Einsatzgruppe B wrong. When asked on the witness stand whether he saw anything morally wrong about the Führer's orders, he replied specifically that he:

"No, your Honor, I considered the decree to be right, because it was part of our aim of the war and therefore it was necessary."

The tribunal asked Naumann to clarify, "Then the Tribunal will accept from your answer that you saw nothing wrong with the order, even though it did involve the killing of defenseless human beings. That is what we draw from your answer." Naumann replied, "Yes, your Honor." Naumann was found guilty of war crimes, crimes against humanity, and membership in a criminal organization, namely the SS and the SD. Naumann was sentenced to death and hanged shortly after midnight on 7 June 1951.

References

External links
Naumann's trial from The Einsatzgruppen Archives
Profile of Naumann from Musmanno, Michael A., Justice. The Eichmann Kommandos. London: Peter Davies. 1961. pp. 156 - 16
Overview

1905 births
1951 deaths
SS-Brigadeführer
Executed people from Saxony
Executions by the United States Nuremberg Military Tribunals
People from Meissen
People from the Kingdom of Saxony
Einsatzgruppen personnel
German people convicted of crimes against humanity
Holocaust perpetrators in Belarus
Holocaust perpetrators in Poland
Holocaust perpetrators in Russia
Holocaust perpetrators in the Netherlands
Waffen-SS personnel
Executed mass murderers